Wolf is a Dutch action drama-martial arts film, and the second film made by Jim Taihattu and Julius Ponten, from Habbekrats, an Independent production company in the Netherlands.

Filmed in Utrecht, Netherlands, while partially filmed in Turkey, the film is spoken primarily in Dutch, with parts spoken in Arabic, English, French and Turkish. Subtitles are shown and are available in both French and English.

The main character is played by Marwan Kenzari.

Plot
Majid (Marwan Kenzari), a talented kickboxer from an anonymous suburb in the Netherlands, finds himself falling deeper into the underworld of kickboxing, gambling and organized crime. He begins to lose sight of what it is he really wants as the lines between the sport and the criminal underworld start to blur, interweaving his family, friends, professional career and criminal life.

Cast
Marwan Kenzari as Majid
Chemseddine Amar as Adil
Bo Maerten as Tessa
Raymond Thiry as Ben
Cahit Ölmez as Hakan

Awards and honours
 Golden Calf: 3
 Best Production Design: 2013
 Best Actor: 2013
 Best Director of a Feature Film: 2013
 San Sebastián International Film Festival Awards: 1
 Youth Jury Award: 2013
 SUBTITLE European Film Festival Awards: 1
 Angela Award: 2013
 Taipei Film Festival Awards: 1
 International New Talent Competition - Special Jury Prize: 2013

See also
 Rabat

References

External links 
 

2013 films
2010s Arabic-language films
2010s Dutch-language films
2010s English-language films
2010s French-language films
2010s Turkish-language films
2010s crime drama films
Dutch crime drama films
Dutch black-and-white films
Kickboxing films
Films set in the Netherlands
Films set in Turkey
Dutch sports films
Films about organized crime in the Netherlands
2013 drama films
Films directed by Jim Taihuttu
2013 multilingual films
Dutch multilingual films